Seticosta rubicola is a species of moth of the family Tortricidae. It is found in Costa Rica and Guatemala. Larvae have been intercepted on Rubus plants arriving in the United States from Guatemala.

The length of the forewings is 5-8.5 mm.  Adults are tan, brown or reddish brown with white and yellow-green markings. Adults have been recorded nearly year-round in multiple generations per year.

The larvae feed on Rubus species, including Rubus eriocarpus and Rubus vulcanicola. They bore into the stem of their host plant, resulting in a gall. Pupation probably takes place outside of the gall. Full-grown larvae reach a length of about 12–13 mm. They have a brownish-purple body and a black to orange head.

References

Moths described in 2003
Seticosta